Rebekka Lynn Armstrong (born 1967) is an American HIV/AIDS activist and former model and bodybuilder. She was Playboy Playmate of the Month for September 1986. Eight years later, she was the first Playmate to publicly announce that she is HIV-positive.

Biography
Armstrong announced that she is HIV-positive in the September 1994 issue of The Advocate. She said that she had known she was infected since 1989, but spent two years after her diagnosis escaping into substance abuse. By the time of the publication of The Advocate article, she had come out as a lesbian and decided to educate others about HIV/AIDS, especially among lesbian and bisexual women. She said she was unsure of when she had contracted the virus, but might have as early as age 16. By the time she was interviewed in 1999 for AIDS Project Los Angeles she identified as bisexual and said she had been infected at 16 "to the best of my knowledge." A University of Toledo events notice in 2004 said that Playboy founder Hugh Hefner and the Playboy Foundation assisted Armstrong financially on her AIDS-awareness campaign, the College Campus Safer Sex education program.

In a 2013 speech to community college students in Spokane, Washington, Armstrong shared details about the early days of her illness, the aggressive AZT treatment that she endured, the good and bad times of that five-year period, and about her suicide attempt followed by a coma and a lengthy hospital stay.

In addition to her former career as a model and her current activism, Armstrong has also competed as a bodybuilder.

Bodybuilding contest history
 2004 Muscle Beach (Venice Beach, CA) – 1st (LW & Overall)
 2004 NPC Los Angeles Championship – 1st (MW)
 2005 NPC Pittsburgh – 1st (MW & Overall)
 2005 NPC Nationals – 12th (HW)
 2009 NPC Los Angeles Championships - 1st (HW and overall)
 2009 NPC USA Championships - 7th (LHW)

References

External links
 Rebekka Online - HIV/AIDS Activist
 
 Profile of Armstrong at Positive Nation
 
 

1967 births
Living people
20th-century American actresses
Actresses from Bakersfield, California
American female bodybuilders
American film actresses
Bisexual women
HIV/AIDS activists
American LGBT sportspeople
People with HIV/AIDS
1980s Playboy Playmates
American sex educators
LGBT people from California
Lesbian sportswomen
LGBT bodybuilders
21st-century American women